Kupka is a surname. Notable people with the surname include:

 František Kupka (1871–1957), Czech painter and graphic artist
 Stephen Kupka (born c. 1946), American baritone saxophone player and composer
 Theofil Kupka (1885–1920), Silesian politician

See also 
5363 Kupka, main-belt asteroid
Kupka, Hlyboka Raion, a village in Ukraine

Surnames from nicknames
Surnames from given names